Gabriel Esparza Pérez (born 31 March 1973 in Pamplona, Navarre) is a Spanish taekwondo practitioner and Olympic medalist. He received a silver medal in 58 kg class at the 2000 Summer Olympics in Sydney. He won three consecutive European Championships in 1992, 1994 and 1996. 

Although many Spanish taekwondo athletes have won medals in international competitions, Esparza was the only Olympic medalist from Spain in taekwondo until the 2012 Summer Olympics, where Spain won three medals in taekwondo (one gold and two silver medals).

Notes

References

External links
 
 
 
 
 

1973 births
Living people
Spanish male taekwondo practitioners
Olympic medalists in taekwondo
Olympic silver medalists for Spain
Taekwondo practitioners at the 2000 Summer Olympics
Medalists at the 2000 Summer Olympics
World Taekwondo Championships medalists
European Taekwondo Championships medalists
Sportspeople from Pamplona